Hermann Willy Hoffmann (15 June 1878  1977) was a German architect.

Life 
Hoffmann studied architecture at the Technical University of Berlin from 1897. In 1907 he got a job in the construction department of the Imperial Post Office. In 1911 Hoffmann went to Hanover as a post-construction engineer, in 1912 to Breslau and in 1914 to Berlin. Presumably he volunteered as a war volunteer when World War I broke out. In 1920 Hoffmann was appointed post office building officer, in 1924 he was appointed post office building officer. In 1934 Willy Hoffmann was retired.

Many of the buildings he designed are now listed buildings.

Buildings 
 1924–1926: Post office W 30 (later post office 30 or 1030) in Berlin-Schöneberg, Geisbergstrasse 7/9
 1925–1926: Post office Niederschöneweide (later post office 119) in Berlin-Niederschöneweide, Fennstrasse 9/11
 1925–1928: Oberpostdirektion (Berlin) (later State Post Office Berlin) in Berlin-Charlottenburg, Dernburgstrasse (building ceramics by John Martens)
 1930: Reconstruction of the counter hall in post office Wilmersdorf 1 (later post office 31) in Berlin-Wilmersdorf, Uhlandstrasse 85
 1930–1931: Lichtenrade post office (later post office 49) in Berlin-Lichtenrade, Bahnhofstrasse 5/6
 1933: Exchange office "Hochmeister" and "Bleibtreu" with post office Halensee 2 (later post office 311) in Berlin-Wilmersdorf, Hochmeisterplatz (demolished 2017)

Literature 
 Association of Architects and Engineers in Berlin (ed.): Post and telecommunications. (= Berlin and its buildings, part X, volume B, volume 4.) Ernst & Sohn, Berlin 1987.
 Falk Jaeger: Posthorn & Imperial Eagle. The historic post offices in Berlin. Nicolaische Verlagbuchhandlung, Berlin 1987, .

Sources 
 Hoffmann buildings in the official Berlin monument database with further information
 Museum of Communication Berlin
 Berlin address book
 Archive of the AIV Berlin
 Landesarchiv Berlin, inventory of the Upper Post Office

Individual records 
 ↑ Birth register StA Halle, No. 1166/1878
 ↑ Death register StA Bad Soden am Taunus, No. 406/1977

1878 births
1977 deaths
19th-century German architects
Postal system of Germany
20th-century German architects
Technical University of Berlin alumni
German military personnel of World War I